A book cover is any protective covering used to bind together the pages of a book. Beyond the familiar distinction between hardcovers and paperbacks, there are further alternatives and additions, such as dust jackets, ring-binding, and older forms such as the nineteenth-century "paper-boards" and the traditional types of hand-binding. The term "Bookcover" is often used for a book cover image in library management software. This article is concerned with modern mechanically produced covers.

History

Before the early nineteenth century, books were hand-bound, in the case of luxury medieval manuscripts in treasure bindings using materials such as gold, silver and jewels. For hundreds of years, book bindings had functioned as a protective device for the expensively printed or hand-made pages, and as a decorative tribute to their cultural authority. In the 1820s great changes began to occur in how a book might be covered, with the gradual introduction of techniques for mechanical book-binding. Cloth, and then paper, became the staple materials used when books became so cheap—thanks to the introduction of steam-powered presses and mechanically produced paper—that to have them hand-bound became disproportionate to the cost of the book itself.

Not only were the new types of book-covers cheaper to produce, they were also printable, using multi-colour lithography, and later, halftone illustration processes. Techniques borrowed from the nineteenth-century poster-artists gradually infiltrated the book industry, as did the professional practice of graphic design. The book cover became more than just a protection for the pages, taking on the function of advertising, and communicating information about the text inside.

Cover design 

The Arts and Crafts and Art Nouveau movements at the turn of the twentieth century stimulated a modern renaissance in book cover design that soon began to infiltrate the growing mass book industry through the more progressive publishers in Europe, London and New York. Some of the first radically modern cover designs were produced in the Soviet Union during the 1920s by avant-gardists such as Alexander Rodchenko and El Lissitzky. Another highly influential early book cover designer was Aubrey Beardsley, thanks to his striking covers for the first four volumes of The Yellow Book (1894–5).

In the post-war era, book covers have become vitally important as the book industry has become commercially competitive. Covers now give detailed hints about the style, genre and subject of the book, while many push design to its limit in the hope of attracting sales attention.

This can differ from country to country because of other tastes of the markets. So translated books can also have different book-accessories such as toys belonging to children's books, for example Harry Potter.

The era of internet sales has arguably not diminished the importance of the book cover, as it now continues its role in a two-dimensional digital form, helping to identify and promote books online.

Wraparound covers are also common.

Contents
Front cover contents may usually be:
For novels, the novel title in large letters, author name, tagline and symbol of publisher (in corner)
Back cover (also called 'lower cover') contents may usually be:
For novels, a back cover text or teaser that gives a hint of the story in an attractive way.
A picture of the writer.
 A summary

See also
Bookbinding – the process of physically assembling a book
Don't judge a book by its cover, a phrase derived from the perceived difference between the portrayal of a book on its cover or jacket, and the book's contents

Further reading
Eighty Years of Book Cover Design, Joseph Connolly. London: Faber and Faber, 2009.

External links

 DigiArt Book Cover
 The Book Cover Archive
 AI art in book cover design
 – containing photographs of decorated publisher bindings from the 1870s to 1930.
 Historical book cover design gallery (archived 10 January 2007)
 Pulp fiction cover gallery
 The Art of Penguin Science Fiction – the history and cover art of science fiction published by Penguin Books from 1935 to the present day
 Thomas Bonn Collection of Publishers Interviews – more than 100 audio interviews with publishers, art directors, etc. on the topic of cover art

Book design
Bookbinding